Vorwerk may refer to:

Vorwerk, Lower Saxony, a municipality in the Rotenburg district, Lower Saxony
a locality of Altenmedingen, in the Uelzen district, Lower Saxony
a subdivision of Celle, Lower Saxony
a Vorwerk (fortification), an advanced fortification of a local castle that often a became serfdom-based agricultural outpost of a manor estate, namegiving for the above-mentioned toponyms   
Vorwerk (company), a German company which produces vacuum cleaners
Vorwerk (chicken), a German breed of chicken